Justice Wilkin may refer to:

J. Foster Wilkin, associate justice of the Ohio Supreme Court
Jacob W. Wilkin, associate justice and chief justice of the Supreme Court of Illinois
Robert Nugen Wilkin, associate justice of the Supreme Court of Ohio

See also
Justice Wilkins (disambiguation)